Bluebeard is a 1972 mystery comedy drama film directed by Edward Dmytryk and starring Richard Burton, Raquel Welch, Joey Heatherton, and Sybil Danning.

The film's plot is very loosely based on the French folktale of a nobleman whose latest wife grows curious when he tells her she may enter any room in his castle but one.

Plot
Set in Austria in the 1930s, Baron Kurt von Sepper is a World War I veteran fighter pilot with a reputation as a "ladykiller" and a frightening blue-tinged beard. In public the Baron carefully maintains his image as a war hero, a seemingly devout Catholic and a patriotic member of the Fatherland Front, but the Baron has two dark secrets he is keen to hide. All of his previous wives have died in mysterious circumstances, and he exploited the chaos of the Austrian Civil War to instigate a pogrom against a Jewish community.

Cast

 Richard Burton as Baron Kurt von Sepper
 Raquel Welch as Magdalena
 Virna Lisi as Elga
 Nathalie Delon as Erika
 Marilù Tolo as Brigitte
 Karin Schubert as Greta
 Agostina Belli as Caroline
 Sybil Danning as the Prostitute
 Joey Heatherton as Anne
 Edward Meeks as Sergio
 Doka Bukova as Rosa
 Jean Lefebvre as Greta's Father
 Erica Schramm as Greta's Mother
 Karl-Otto Alberty as Baron's Friend
 Kurt Großkurth as Baron's Friend
 Thomas Fischer as Baron's Friend
 Peter Martin Urtel as Baron's Friend
 Mag-Avril as Marka
 Sándor Szabó as The Doctor
 Dennis Burgess as The Coroner
 Mathieu Carrière as The Violinist

Production
Filmportal.de noted that some sources claim that Luciano Sacripanti also directed the film.

Filming took place in Budapest, Hungary and Rome, Italy. In February, 1972, Burton's wife, Elizabeth Taylor celebrated her 40th birthday in Budapest. The party, held at the Hotel Intercontinental, was attended by several celebrities, including Michael Caine, Grace Kelly, Ringo Starr, David Niven, and Raquel Welch, and became a huge media sensation in the then-Communist country.

Release
Bluebeard had its world premiere at the Pantages Theatre in Hollywood on August 15, 1972. It was released in West Germany on December 15, 1972.

Reception

Critical response
Roger Ebert gave the film two stars out of four and wrote, "There is no longer any novelty in watching the sad disintegration of Richard Burton's acting career." Roger Greenspun of The New York Times wrote: "I have rarely seen a horror film so coyly aware of its own camp potential. But it is better at being foolishly serious than at being slyly humorous, and its few good moments come before it admits that its spook lightning and its maybe 3,000 pounds of phony cobwebs are essentially a joke." Gene Siskel of the Chicago Tribune gave the film one star out of four and wrote that the scenes of sadism "are designed to pander to people who enjoy seeing women abused". He put the film on a year-end list he made of the sickest films of 1972. Variety called it "high camp". Kevin Thomas of the Los Angeles Times panned the film as "123 minutes of unrelieved boredom and morbidity", adding: "Heavily made up and dyed, and speaking in a post-synched German accent, Burton seems to be sleepwalking."

Gary Arnold of The Washington Post wrote: "Bluebeard is so lacking in both style and conviction that it's often more muddled and ineffective than actively offensive." He wrote of Burton that "unless he's contemplating a permanent career in exploitation movies, it would be difficult to sink below this credit ... his final words are, 'This is ridiculous', but he's done nothing to convince us that he's superior to the material, that he's just doing some good-humored slumming and ought to be indulged his bad judgment". Clyde Jeavons of The Monthly Film Bulletin faulted "Dmytryk's indecision over whether to plump for black comedy or straight-faced horror, and it demonstrates his overall failure to find either a style or a formula sturdy enough to carry the film's heavy burden of absurdities and plain bad acting".

References

External links

1972 films
Films scored by Ennio Morricone
Films based on Bluebeard
Films directed by Edward Dmytryk
Films set in the 1920s
Films set in the 1930s
Films set in Austria
Films set in Germany
Films shot in Budapest
Films shot in Hungary
Films set in castles
1970s thriller films
French serial killer films
West German films
Italian thriller films
English-language French films
English-language German films
English-language Italian films
1970s English-language films
1970s Italian films
1970s French films